Škofja Vas is a settlement in the City Municipality of Celje in eastern Slovenia. It lies on the Hudinja River in the northern outskirts of Celje. The area is part of the traditional region of Styria. It is now included with the rest of the municipality in the Savinja Statistical Region.

References

External links
Škofja Vas on Geopedia

Populated places in the City Municipality of Celje